Epimelitta mimica is a species of beetle in the family Cerambycidae. It was described by Bates in 1873.

References

Epimelitta
Beetles described in 1873